Mallotojaponin C is a dimeric phlorogucinol found in Mallotus oppositifolius.

The bioassay-guided fractionation of an ethanol extract of the leaves and inflorescence of M. oppositifolius collected in Madagascar led to the isolation of the two new bioactive dimeric phloroglucinols mallotojaponins B and C, together with mallotophenone. These compounds show antiproliferative and antiplasmodial activities.

References 

Phloroglucinols
Natural phenol dimers